Carmel Hamlet, commonly known simply as Carmel, is a hamlet and census-designated place (CDP) located in the Town of Carmel in Putnam County, New York, United States. As of the 2010 census, the population was 6,817.

The hamlet is the site of the historic County Court House (built 1814), the David D. Bruen County Office Building, and other structures, and borders Lake Gleneida. Next to the lake stands a bronze statue commemorating Sybil Ludington.

Geography
Carmel Hamlet is located at  (41.420535, -73.677292).

Demographics

As of the census of 2000, there were 5,650 people, 1,975 households, and 1,449 families residing in the community. The population density was 665.2 per square mile (256.9/km2). There were 2,034 housing units at an average density of 239.5/sq mi (92.5/km2). The racial makeup of the CDP was 93.42% White, 1.56% African American, 0.25% Native American, 0.80% Asian, 0.02% Pacific Islander, 2.16% from other races, and 1.81% from two or more races. Hispanic or Latino of any race were 7.89% of the population.

There were 1,975 households, out of which 35.2% had children under the age of 18 living with them, 62.8% were married couples living together, 6.9% had a female householder with no husband present, and 26.6% were non-families. 21.8% of all households were made up of individuals, and 8.8% had someone living alone who was 65 years of age or older. The average household size was 2.77 and the average family size was 3.26.

In the hamlet the population was spread out, with 25.1% under the age of 18, 5.7% from 18 to 24, 33.1% from 25 to 44, 23.5% from 45 to 64, and 12.6% who were 65 years of age or older. The median age was 38 years. For every 100 females, there were 98.3 males. For every 100 females age 18 and over, there were 95.3 males.

The median income for a household in the community was $66,755, and the median income for a family was $85,488. Males had a median income of $51,910 versus $36,612 for females. The per capita income for the CDP was $29,523. About 3.4% of families and 5.1% of the population were below the poverty line, including 3.5% of those under age 18 and 7.2% of those age 65 or over.

References

External links
Reed Memorial Library
 Greater Mahopac-Carmel Chamber of Commerce
 Carmel, New York

See also
 Town of Carmel Police Department (New York)
Downstate New York

County seats in New York (state)
Census-designated places in New York (state)
Hamlets in New York (state)
Census-designated places in Putnam County, New York
Hamlets in Putnam County, New York